Orville Luther Trask (December 3, 1934 – November 12, 2008) was an American football defensive tackle. He played college football at Rice University before playing for the Houston Oilers, where he won the 1960 and 1961 American Football League championships. He then played for the Oakland Raiders in 1962 before retiring following a shoulder injury and returning to his family life. Raising his 5 children; Keville, Juville, Oweville, Eville, and Manville.

Personal life
Trask's grandson, Kyle Trask, was a quarterback for the Florida Gators in the late 2010s and was drafted by the Tampa Bay Buccaneers in the second round, 64th overall, of the 2021 NFL Draft.

References

External links
 Trask in the 1961 Oilers' team photo

1934 births
2008 deaths
Sportspeople from Pueblo, Colorado
Players of American football from Colorado
American football defensive tackles
San Jacinto College alumni
Rice Owls football players
Houston Oilers players
Oakland Raiders players
American Football League players